Alejandro "Álex" Centelles Plaza (born 30 August 1999) is a Spanish professional footballer who plays for UD Almería as a left back.

Club career
Born in Valencia, Centelles joined Valencia CF's youth setup at the age of eight, from CF Crack's. After spending the whole 2017 pre-season with the first team, he was subsequently assigned to the reserves in Segunda División B on 2 August.

Centelles made his senior debut on 20 August 2017, starting in a 2–0 away win against Deportivo Aragón. The following 24 May, after being an ever-present figure for the B-team during the campaign, he signed a new contract until 2021.

On 1 July 2019, Centelles joined Primeira Liga newcomers F.C. Famalicão on loan for one year. He made his professional debut on 14 September, starting in a 4–2 home defeat of F.C. Paços de Ferreira.

On 2 October 2020, Centelles signed a two-year contract with Segunda División side UD Almería.

Personal life
Centelles' father José was also a footballer, and also represented Valencia Mestalla.

Career statistics

Club

References

External links

1999 births
Living people
Footballers from Valencia (city)
Spanish footballers
Association football defenders
Segunda División players
Segunda División B players
Valencia CF Mestalla footballers
Valencia CF players
UD Almería players
Primeira Liga players
F.C. Famalicão players
Spain youth international footballers
Spanish expatriate footballers
Spanish expatriate sportspeople in Portugal
Expatriate footballers in Portugal